The International Socialists is a Trotskyist organisation in Denmark. 

IS was set up in 1984 as split from the Left Socialists. It is part of the International Socialist Tendency led by the British Socialist Workers Party. The International Socialists are mainly involved in activities aiming at organising students. When ATTAC was founded in Denmark, IS worked with the organisation. Later on IS members pulled out of ATTAC claiming that the organisation had no substance. As an organisation closely connected to the British Socialist Workers Party IS has a similar, if not identical approach on the Iraq issue, i.e. giving the various resistance movements of Iraq unconditional but tactical support. The Danish media has attracted attention on IS because of this issue. 

In 1992, its office in the capital was attacked and one of its members was killed as a result.

At its congress in March 2006 IS decided to collectively join the broader Red-Green Alliance. IS will however maintain its own organisation and keep publishing its monthly Socialistisk Arbejderavis. On 18 January 2015 the IS decided to leave the Red-Green Alliance.

External links
ISU (in Danish)
1984 establishments in Denmark
Communist parties in Denmark
International Socialist Tendency
Organizations established in 1984
Trotskyism in Denmark